Sardar Heera Singh Sandhu (1706–1776) was the founder of Nakai Misl, one of the twelve Sikh Misls that later became the Sikh Empire under the leadership of Ranjit Singh. He was born in a Sandhu Jat Sikh family in present day Pakistan. Heera Singh Sandhu was killed in battle near Pakpattan when he partook in a battle against a Chisti army of devotees of Baba Farid's shrine in 1776.

Life
Heera Singh Sandhu was born into Jat Sikh family in 1706 in the region of Punjab in what is now Pakistan. He took possession of the lands surrounding his native village, Baherwal Kalan and countryside of Kasur which was located in the Nakka country South of Majha Region. He took Amrit Sanchar (Sikh Baptism) in 1731. Nakka in Punjabi means border or some sort of a gateway and the Nakka country was located between the Ravi and Sutlej south of Lahore. He also took Chunian from the Afghans but died (became a Shaheed) in a battle against Sujan Chisti for Pakpattan. His companions brought his dead body to Baherwal where it was cremated. Heera Singh Sandhu's son, Dal Singh Sandhu, was a minor, so his nephew, Nar Singh Sandhu son of Heera Singh Sandhu's brother Natha Singh Sandhu, succeeded him as leader of the misl. Natha Singh is the father of Sardar Ran Singh Nakai and grandfather of Maharani Datar Kaur, wife of Maharaja Ranjit Singh and mother of Maharaja Kharak Singh.

References

1706 births
1767 deaths
Sikh warriors